Han Li (born 16 January 1988) is a Chinese badminton player from Tai'an, Shandong. In 2003, she was elected to join the Chinese national youth team, and two years later she joined the national senior team. In 2006, she won the gold medal at the World Junior Championships in the mixed team event. In 2012, she won two Grand Prix Gold title at the Australia Open and Indonesian Masters tournament. In 2013, she won the women's singles gold medal at the East Asian Games in Tianjin.

Achievements

East Asian Games 
Women's singles

Asian Junior Championships 
Girls' singles

BWF Grand Prix 
The BWF Grand Prix has two levels, the BWF Grand Prix and Grand Prix Gold. It is a series of badminton tournaments sanctioned by the Badminton World Federation (BWF) since 2007.

Women's singles

  BWF Grand Prix Gold tournament
  BWF Grand Prix tournament

References

External links 
 

1988 births
Living people
People from Tai'an
Badminton players from Shandong
Chinese female badminton players